Pasupuleti Venkata Bangarraju, know professionally as Krishna Vamsi, is an Indian film director, producer and choreographer known for his work in Telugu cinema. Vamsi started his career as an assistant director to Ram Gopal Varma. He made his directorial debut with the 1995 crime film Gulabi, starring J. D. Chakravarthi. He has received two National Film Awards, three Filmfare Awards South and four Nandi Awards.

In 1996, he directed the film Ninne Pelladata, one of the highest grossing Telugu films of the time. He subsequently directed the critically acclaimed crime film, Sindhooram under his production house Andhra Talkies; both the films won the National Film Award for Best Feature Film in Telugu. In 2002, he ventured into Bollywood with Shakti: The Power, a remake of his own 1998 Telugu cult classic Antahpuram.

Personal life
Krishna Vamsi is married to Ramya Krishnan, a South Indian actress. Ramya Krishnan acted in two of his films; Sri Anjaneyam (in a guest role) and Chandralekha, prior to marriage. Krishna Vamsi is known to be a fan of Sitarama Sastry. The films for which Sitarama Sastry wrote lyrics, which are directed by Krishna Vamsi include Ninne Pelladatha, Gulabi, Sindhooram, Chandralekha, Murari, Khadgam, Chakram, Mahatma, and Paisa. Sirivennela Seetharama Sastry adopted Krishna Vamsi, not legally through Indian Government Gazette, but by the traditional Hindu method.

Filmography

References

External links

Dr. Bhimrao Ambedkar University alumni
Telugu film directors
Living people
Filmfare Awards South winners
20th-century Indian film directors
Nandi Award winners
People from West Godavari district
21st-century Indian film directors
Film directors from Andhra Pradesh
Film producers from Andhra Pradesh
1962 births